Eileen O'Brien may refer to:

 Eileen O'Brien (actress), English actress
 Eileen O'Brien (journalist) (1925-1986), Irish journalist 
 Eileen O'Brien (camogie), Irish camogie player
 Eileen O'Brien (baseball) (1922–2015), played in the All-American Girls Professional Baseball League in 1946
 Eileen O'Brien, musician, daughter of accordionist Paddy O'Brien